Penelope Claire Lancaster, Lady Stewart (born 15 March 1971) is an English model and television personality. She is married to rock singer Rod Stewart. In 2014, she joined the ITV lunchtime show Loose Women.

Early life
Lancaster was born to Graham and Sally and has a brother named Oliver. At the age of six, Lancaster took up dance, including tap, ballet and modern. At 16, she gave up because of her height and decided that aerobics would better suit her frame, and six years later she became a certified fitness trainer. It was during this time that she was spotted by a model scout, who suggested she should consider a career in modelling. Lancaster suffers from a chronic sweat problem called hyperhidrosis.

Career

Early career
Throughout the 1990s, Lancaster was in a long-term relationship with city trader Mickey Sloan. They lived in Bermuda from 1996 to 1998 but separated in 1999.

Around this time, Lancaster decided to learn about the other side of modelling and began taking photography classes.

Ultimo
In 2002, Lancaster signed up to be the face of designer lingerie brand Ultimo for £200,000. Although she was a success at promoting the brand—raising its profile, especially in the United Kingdom—two years later, Lancaster's contract was not renewed. She was replaced in the role by Rod Stewart's ex-wife Rachel Hunter. The decision, dubbed Bra Wars by the British press, was seen as a publicity stunt, which infuriated Stewart, who described Ultimo's founder Michelle Mone as "manipulative". However, two of Stewart's daughters—Kimberly and Ruby—have since modelled for Ultimo.

Strictly Come Dancing

Lancaster was one of fourteen celebrities taking part in the fifth series of Strictly Come Dancing in 2007. In week 4, she was revealed as one of the bottom two participants. She and her dancing partner, (Ian Waite), were in the week six dance-off with Matt Di Angelo and were voted off.

Performances

Loose Women

On 15 September 2014, Lancaster was billed as an occasional panellist on the lunchtime TV chat show Loose Women. She made four subsequent appearances during her first series. Through series 20 and 21 Lancaster started appearing on the show more regularly, usually twice per month. However, from series 22, Lancaster returned to appearing much more infrequently, making a total of six appearances. This was followed by a further ten appearances in series 23 and four in series 24. In series 25, she appeared more frequently and was a regular panellist. In the current series, she has not yet appeared as a panellist but has appeared as a guest.  She has not officially left the show.

Other television work

In January 2018, Lancaster participated in And They're Off! in aid of Sport Relief.

In January 2019, she appeared in an episode of Celebrity Catchphrase. In February 2019, she appeared in Famous and Fighting Crime alongside fellow celebrities Jamie Laing, Katie Piper, Sandi Bogle and Marcus Brigstocke on Channel 4.

In 2021, Lancaster was a competitor on BBC's Celebrity MasterChef. She made it as far as her quarter final, losing out to Melanie Sykes and Megan McKenna.

Police work 
In 2020, after appearing on Channel 4's Famous and Fighting Crime, Lancaster joined the City of London Police as a volunteer special constable. In April 2021, she completed her training to become a special police constable and is now fully qualified. She was on policing duties during the Queen’s funeral.

Personal life
In 1999, Lancaster met singer Rod Stewart when he agreed to let her take photos of him on tour. A romance soon developed and they began a seven-year courtship. Lancaster gave birth to their first child, Alastair Wallace Stewart, on 27 November 2005. Lancaster and Stewart married on 16 June 2007 at La Cervara near Portofino, Italy. On 17 February 2011, it was announced that Lancaster had given birth to their second child (Stewart's eighth), Aiden Patrick Stewart. 

Lancaster is an ambassador for Penny for London, a charity helping young people escape poverty, supported by Northern & Shell, the parent company of the Daily Express, Goldman Sachs, Barclaycard and VISA. She is also a vice-president of the Royal National Institute of Blind People.

At the age of 46, Lancaster was diagnosed with dyslexia.

References

External links

1971 births
Living people
English female models
People from Chelmsford
Family of Rod Stewart
Photographers from Essex
British special constables
Wives of knights